Rio Pequeno may refer to:

 Rio Pequeno (district of São Paulo), a district in the city of São Paulo, Brazil
 Rio Pequeno (Santa Catarina), a tributary of the Braço do Norte River in southeastern Brazil
 Rio Pequeno (São Paulo), a tributary of Pinheiros River in southeastern Brazil